The Rur is a river mostly in Germany.

Rur or RUR may also refer to:

Organisations 
 Royal Ulster Rifles, a British Army regiment  (1793–1968)
 Rugby Union of Russia, a sports governing body (founded 1936)

Technology 
 Eric (robot) or R.U.R., a 1928 British humanoid robot
 RUR-PLE, a 2004 educational Python programming tool

Other uses 
 R.U.R., a 1920 Czech sci-fi play by Karel Čapek
 Russian ruble, a currency (pre-1998 ISO 4217 code: RUR)
 Ohaw, or rur, a Japanese soup dish
 Rur., an abbreviation for "rural"

See also 
RIR (disambiguation)
Roar (disambiguation)
Röhr (disambiguation)—including another German river
 Ruhr (disambiguation)—including another German river